The term sub-Neptune can refer to a planet with smaller radius than Neptune even though it may have a larger mass or to a planet with a smaller mass than Neptune even though it may have a larger radius like a super-puff and both meanings can even be used in the same publication.

Neptune like planets are considerably rarer than sub-Neptune sized planets, despite being only slightly bigger. This “radius cliff” separates sub-Neptunes (<) from Neptunes (>). This radius-cliff is thought to arise because during formation when gas is accreting, the atmospheres of planets that size reach the pressures required to force the hydrogen into the magma ocean stalling radius growth. Then, once the magma ocean saturates, radius growth can continue. However, planets that have enough gas to reach saturation are much rarer, because they require much more gas.

See also
Super-Earth
Mini-Neptune
Mega-Earth

Further reading
The nature and origins of sub-Neptune size planets, Jacob L. Bean, Sean N. Raymond, James E. Owen, 22 Oct 2020

References

Exoplanets